This is a list of the R&B albums that ranked number one in Canada during 1998 according to SoundScan. Each weekly chart is based on sales "compiled from a national sample of retail store and mass merchants' reports."

Chart history

References

RandB
Canada RandB Albums
RandB 1998